Iron Invader (also known as Iron Golem and Metal Shifters) is a 2011 science fiction television film directed by Paul Ziller. The drama features Kavan Smith and Nicole de Boer. The film premiered on the Syfy channel on February 12, 2011.

Plot
The film starts with a meteorite crashing into a satellite, causing it to crash down in a little town. A man named Greg Aupolous sees this and takes a piece, not noticing the spreading green goo on it. The goo spreads to his hand, causing his veins to pop on his face and he is killed.
               
Jake (Kavan Smith) and his younger brother Ethan are working on building an inn. They too saw the falling dish and take it to see Earl. They carefully wrap it up and go, planning to sell it for money to pay off the inn.

Earl is working on another sculpture he calls Iron Golem, protector of ancient towns. Jake and Ethan sell the satellite, but for only $800. On their way from the market, Jake and Ethan see Jake's old high school sweetheart Amanda (Nicole de Boer) and her daughter Claire (Merrit Patterson). Amanda says she and Claire are staying at Amanda's aunt's house, until she can figure out what to do with her divorce. The scene switches to Earl working on his statue when, without his notice, the gooed pieces fly onto the statue, infecting it. This causes the gigantic statue to spring to life, its force knocking Earl unconscious. A nearby trucker's truck stops all of a sudden, and the radio blurs. He steps out his truck to see the problem when the Iron Invader comes and kills him, the same way how Greg was killed.

Amanda, her daughter Claire and her aunt are at the house when the Iron Golem attacks, killing the aunt. Amanda and Claire flee to the town, to find the sheriff. While Jake went to send a finder's fee to Greg Aupolous's house Iron came to the inn and killed Ethan. Jake returns to find Ethan dead and sees Iron walking away. Jake alerts the sheriff, but Earl also hears the report on his CB radio and they drive to the inn. Jake scolds at Earl for thinking Iron is a robot that he created when he arrived. The sheriff calls the town coroner to check on Ethan's body to see how he died and finds that his arteries and veins were infected and swelled. Jake denies the coroner's statement and goes off to hunt Iron.

The sheriff returns to the police station where Amanda and Claire approach him. Soon, lights all around begin to flicker. Inside the local pub, Max, bartender Tony (Chris Gauthier), and Harry see this too along with Earl in his car which suddenly died. Out the window, Tony sees Amanda, Claire and the sheriff, along with Iron coming their way. Claire turns and runs while Iron chases her. Claire falls and gets a bloody forehead. Right before Iron grabs her, Max appears and helps her escape. Jake returns in his car and sees Iron. Jake attempts to ram Iron until his car dies as well, but he managed to break off Iron's leg, causing it to fall apart. The infected pieces are still alive however, and one them grabs the sheriff and kills him. Jake gets Amanda and they and Earl hide in the pub with Tony and Harry.

The kids run into Deputy Jenny (Chelah Horsdal), who doesn't believe the kids, who goes to see and have the kids locked in her car. While crying over the dead sheriff, Jenny is infected and dies. In the inn, the adults examine the goo covering only the blade of an ax and find out that the goo is an alien bacteria that feeds off metal, sucking the metal from human blood (humans have metal/iron in their blood) and killing them. Outside, Iron puts himself back together, and Claire and Max are still locked in Jenny's dead car (it was revealed that Iron causes static electricity and effect electronics which make the car inoperable) as Iron tries to grab Claire. She is touched, but not harmed.

In the inn, they discover that, with blood, they can trick Iron into exploding. Jake and Amanda get gasoline and cover the tank with Amanda's vein blood. They plan to shoot it when Iron is close enough. With the blood, Iron is still worried about Claire. So Amanda unwraps her arm, releasing her scent of blood, attracting Iron. Max then escapes out of the car.

In the inn, the infected metal ax blade puts itself into Tony's leg, killing him. Harry and Earl go through different anti-bacterial things but to no avail. But when Earl goes outside to check on Max and Amanda reenters the pub, a beer bottle spills on it and begins to dissolve. Harry then realizes that the bacteria hates alcohol when he accidentally drops his glass on the axe-head, so he and Amanda run outside with it.

Iron gets close to the gasoline, Jake shoots, and he explodes. Pieces fly everywhere, knocking out Max, Earl, and Jake. A flamed piece lands on the hood of Jenny's car, and Claire barely escapes. Although a big explosion, the Pieces are still alive. Claire runs over to Max and tries to wake him up. Jake puts the beer into a spray container, and begins to spray the Pieces, killing the flames and the bacteria, while the others throw beer bottles. A little car engine makes its way to Max. Before it can infect him, Amanda appears and sprays it down. The mother and daughter are reunited. Max awakens and hugs Claire.

The next morning, Jake, Amanda, and Earl go to the junkyard to crush the pieces. While doing so, Earl releases his special beer, and the three share it. Jake says the government didn't believe the story and they are coming to arrest him. Outside, he and Amanda share a kiss. Earl comes out, just in time to see the metal springing back to life, forcing Earl to break the special bottle in order to stop the last fragment. When Amanda asks if he has any more special beer to douse the yard and ensure the bacteria's destruction, he pauses, then says "Do bears crap in the woods?", a phrase he said early in the film.

Cast
 Kavan Smith as Jake Hampton
 Colby Johannson as Ethan Hampton
 Nicole de Boer as Amanda Spelling
 Merritt Patterson as Claire Spelling
 Jesse Moss as Max
 Donnelly Rhodes as Earl
 Paul McGillion as Sheriff Bill
 Chelah Horsdal as Deputy Jenny
 Don Thompson as Harry
 Chris Gauthier as Tony
 Alvin Sanders as Coroner
 Scott McNeil as Cowboy
 Mark McConchie as Farmer Steve Gregoropoulos

References

External links
 
 Iron Invader film clip at Hulu

2011 television films
2011 films
2010s monster movies
2010s science fiction films
Canadian science fiction television films
CineTel Films films
English-language Canadian films
Films about impact events
Films directed by Paul Ziller
Giant monster films
Syfy original films
2010s Canadian films